The British overseas territory of Saint Helena, Ascension and Tristan da Cunha, simply known as "Saint Helena", the most populous region in the territory, has competed in five Commonwealth Games. The first was in 1982, after which they were absent from the Games for sixteen years, before returning in 1998. They have competed in every subsequent Games to date. Saint Helena has never won a medal at the Commonwealth Games.

The territory changed its name in 2009 — previously it was known as "St Helena and Dependencies". The remoteness of the territory and lack of transport links to the rest of the world makes it difficult for teams to reach the Commonwealth Games.

References

 
Nations at the Commonwealth Games